The Shire of Moyne is a local government area in the Barwon South West region of Victoria, Australia, located in the south-western part of the state. It includes the towns of Port Fairy, Koroit, Mortlake, Macarthur, Peterborough, Caramut, Ellerslie, Framlingham, Garvoc, Hawkesdale, Kirkstall, Panmure, Mailors Flat, Purnim, Wangoom and Woolsthorpe. It also entirely surrounds the City of Warrnambool, a separate local government area. It was formed in 1994 from the amalgamation of the Shire of Belfast, Shire of Minhamite, Borough of Port Fairy, and parts of the Shire of Mortlake, Shire of Warrnambool, Shire of Dundas, Shire of Mount Rouse and Shire of Hampden.

The Shire is governed and administered by the Moyne Shire Council; its seat of local government and administrative centre is located at the council headquarters in Port Fairy, it also has a customer service center in Mortlake, a works depot in Koroit, Mortlake and Macarthur. The Shire is named after the Moyne River, a major geographical feature that meanders through the LGA.

The industry base for the area includes:  Dairy, beef cattle, sheep, vegetable production, manufacturing, quarrying, food products, pharmaceuticals, seafood), tourism.

Traditional ownership
The formally recognised traditional owners for the area in which the Shire of Moyne sits are the Eastern Maar peoples and Gunditjmara people, who are represented by the Eastern Maar Aboriginal Corporation (EMAC) and the Gunditj Mirring Traditional Owners Aboriginal Corporation (GMTOAC).

Council

Current composition
The council is composed of seven councillors elected to represent an unsubdivided municipality.

Administration and governance
The council meets in the council chambers at the Mortlake Municipal Office. Administrative activities are conducted at both the Port Fairy and Mortlake offices, which also provide customer services centers.

Townships and localities
The 2021 census, the shire had a population of 17,374 up from 16,495 in the 2016 census

^ - Territory divided with another LGA
* - Not noted in 2016 Census
# - Not noted in 2021 Census

See also
 List of localities in Victoria

References

External links

Moyne Shire Council official website
Metlink local public transport map 
Link to Land Victoria interactive maps

Local government areas of Victoria (Australia)
Barwon South West (region)